Maja Savić (born 27 July 1994) is a Serbian professional racing cyclist. She rode for the UCI Women's Team  during the 2019 women's road cycling season. She has twice finished third in the road race at the Serbian National Road Championships and was runner-up in the time trial at the 2019 championships.

References

External links

1994 births
Living people
Serbian female cyclists
Place of birth missing (living people)